The Peking University School of Transnational Law (STL or PKUSTL)  is located in Shenzhen, Guangdong, China. The school started in the fall of 2008 as a part of the Shenzhen Graduate School of Peking University. It is the first law school to offer a traditional western-style Juris Doctor (J.D.) degree (in English) alongside a Chinese-style Juris Master (J.M.) degree (in Mandarin).  The program is four years and graduates will receive both the Chinese Juris Master's degree and, not accredited by the ABA, a J.D. degree. STL also offers a 3-year J.D. degree in English and a 1-2-year LL.M. degree. The school's tagline is "China's most innovative law school in China's most innovative city"

Jeffrey S. Lehman is the founding dean. 
Philip McConnaughay is the current dean.

Admissions 
Admission to STL is subject to a rigorous admissions procedure. Admissions is on a rolling basis but the deadline is late March each year.

In 2015 STL established a post-graduate LL.M. (Master of Laws) degree for foreign students who already have a first degree in law and who already may be practicing lawyers in their home nations.

Distinguished faculty 

STL’s full-time resident faculty includes scholars of the future of law practice, international trade law, food safety policy, public international law and private dispute resolution, along with scholars of investment treaty arbitration, capital markets, securities regulation, comparative corporate governance, Chinese legal history and philosophy, Chinese environmental regulation and administrative law, China civil law, and several other fields of law. The faculty is multinational in background and follow a Western-style interactive teaching methodology.

Competitions and Student Organizations

STL sponsors students to compete in several moot court competitions, including  Jessup International Moot Court Competition, Vis (east) International Commercial Arbitration Moot, Red Cross International Humanitarian Law Competition, International Criminal Court (ICC) Trial Competition and ELSA WTO Moot Court Competition. STL participates in Law Without Walls program. STL has several student organizations, including Public Interest Law Foundation (PILF), Society of Women in Law, The Journal of Transnational Law, etc.

References

External links
Peking University School of Transnational Law
Peking University Shenzhen Graduate School

Peking University
Universities and colleges in Shenzhen